The rhythmic gymnastics events at the 2009 World Games in Kaohsiung was played between 17 and 18 July. 23 rhythmic gymnastics competitors, from 17 nations, participated in the tournament. The rhythmic gymnastics competition took place at Kaohsiung Arena.

Participating nations

Medal table

Events

References

External links
 Fédération Internationale de Gymnastique
 Gymnastics on IWGA website
 Results

 
2009 World Games
World Games